The 2020 Sabah state election took place on 26 September 2020 to elect all 73 elected members of the 16th Sabah State Legislative Assembly. The previous Assembly was dissolved on 30 July 2020.

The state snap election was called prematurely after a political crisis arose. Both Shafie Apdal, incumbent Chief Minister and leader of Sabah Heritage Party (WARISAN) and Pakatan Harapan (PH) coalition government and Musa Aman, leader of Perikatan Nasional (PN) and Barisan Nasional (BN) coalition opposition claimed to have the majority to form the government. However, the Governor of Sabah, Juhar Mahiruddin decided to dissolve the State Legislative Assembly on the advice of Shafie.

The state election was conducted under the New Normal and special standard operating procedures (SOP) imposed by the Electoral Commission (EC) as the country is still observing the Recovery Movement Control Order (RMCO) due to COVID-19 pandemic.

Gabungan Rakyat Sabah (GRS) coalition won the election with a simple majority of 38 seats. Hajiji Noor from BERSATU–PN was sworn in as Chief Minister 3 days later. The alliance of Perikatan Nasional with 17 seats, Barisan Nasional with 14 seats, and PBS with 7 seats made GRS the biggest electoral coalition in Sabah since September 2020.

This was the first Sabah state election not held on the same day as the Malaysia general election since 1999, when Sabah held its election on March that year as opposed to the general election date on November 1999.

Background 
The 14th general election witnessed 29 seats from the government side and 31 seats from the non-government side filled the State Legislative Assembly. This count, however, did not include six seats from United Progressive Kinabalu Organisation (UPKO) and four from UMNO that switched allegiance from Musa to Shafie. The government side has 11 safe seats and four fairly safe seats, while the non-government side has two safe seats and fivefairly safe seats.

Constituencies 
13 new seats are added into the existing 60 state constituencies as a result of redelineation of Sabah state constituencies approved by the Dewan Rakyat on 17 July 2019. The new seats are Bengkoka, Bandau, Pintasan, Pantai Dalit, Darau, Tanjung Keramat, Limbahau, Tulid, Telupid, Sungai Manila, Lamag, Segama and Kukusan.

Departing incumbents 
The following members of the 15th State Legislative Assembly did not participate in this election.

Opinion polls
The following table shows recent opinion polling from last two weeks.

Results

Summary

Seats that changed allegiance

Election pendulum 
The 14th general election witnessed 29 seats from the government side and 31 seats from the non-government side filled the State Legislative Assembly. This count, however, did not include 6 seats from United Progressive Kinabalu Organisation (UPKO) and 4 from United Malays National Organisation (UMNO) that switched allegiance from Musa to Shafie. The government side has 11 safe seats and 4 fairly safe seats, while the non-government side has 2 safe seats and 5 fairly safe seats.

Aftermath 

The GRS governing coalition formed on September 2020 after the victory consists of 
 United Malays National Organisation (UMNO) (14) :Barisan National Party seat – Won 14 seats 
 Malaysian United Indigenous Party (BERSATU) (11), Homeland Solidarity Party (STAR) (6) : Perikatan Nasional – Won 17 seats 
 With support from United Sabah Party (PBS) (7).

Warisan saw a gain of 2 more seats from its previous 21 seats in the 2018 election. While its ally PKR and DAP retained their number of seats with 2 and 6 respectively. Warisan also made history by becoming the first and only single party in Sabah to not govern the state despite winning the most seats overall.

On the other side, STAR, led by Jeffrey Kitingan won 6 seats compared to 2 in the previous election, with most of the seats won hailing from the interior of Sabah which is dominated by the Kadazan-Dusun-Murut (KDM) community. UPKO, even though representing the KDM community, managed only 1 seat in this election, a loss from 6 seats in the previous election.

PPBM or Bersatu, despite being a Malay-based party from West Malaysia and contesting in Sabah for the first time, won 11 seats.

The elected assemblywoman for Bugaya, Manis Muka Mohd Darah from WARISAN later passed away on November 2020, triggering a by-election which was not held until November 2022, concurrently with the 2022 Malaysian general election. A few elected assemblymen also changed parties after the election; see List of seats that changed allegiance in Sabah after state election 2020.

COVID-19 pandemic 

Following the Sabah state government's announcement on 9 August that the state election would be held on 26 September, several members of the public and democracy observers urged local authorities to consider postal voting due to the ongoing pandemic and in order to reduce virus transmissions during the election. On 21 August, the High Court dismissed an appeal by 33 Sabah assemblymen against Governor Juhar Mahiruddin's consent for the dissolution of Sabah's legislative assembly, allowing the state election to go ahead. On 11 September, the Federal Court dismissed Datuk Jahid Noordin Jahim's appeal to stop the election, allowing nominations to proceed the following day.

The return of voters and politicians from Sabah to Peninsular Malaysia has caused a significant influx of COVID-19 cases in Malaysia. Daily reported cases increased to three digit numbers. Several of these ministers and politicians had reportedly not complied with standard procedures around COVID-19. On 14 October, the Federal Government announced the implementation of a Conditional Movement Control Order in Selangor, Putrajaya and Kuala Lumpur due to the rising number of cases.

Effects of the 2022 general election 

Following the results of the Malaysian general election in November 2022, and the formation of government consisting of the alliance between Pakatan Harapan and Barisan Nasional, GRS announced their inclusion into the alliance (despite GRS members Bersatu, SAPP and STAR aligning with Perikatan Nasional at the time), and signed a cooperation agreement with other parties involved on 16 December 2022. On 10 December 2022, MLAs and MPs from Bersatu Sabah announced they will quit the party and become direct member of GRS, in line of the coalition at federal level. On 17 December 2022, GRS officially expelled Bersatu from the coalition.  STAR, another member party of both GRS and PN, announced its exit from PN on 5 December 2022. SAPP is the only member party of both GRS and PN as of December 2022.

Aside from the change above, the status quo is not changed for the government in Sabah. Even though PH and WARISAN is allied with GRS at federal level, they are still opposition to the GRS-led administration at state level.

2023 political crisis

See also 
 Politics of Malaysia
 List of political parties in Malaysia

Notes

References 

Sabah state elections
Sabah
Sabah
COVID-19 pandemic in Malaysia